Mohamed Mehedi Hasan Royal, also ‍spelled as Mehadi Hasan Royel, is a Bangladeshi professional footballer who plays as a forward for Bangladesh Premier League club Abahani Limited Dhaka and the Bangladesh national team. He debuted against Nepal on 27 March, 2021.

Personal life 
Royal born in Mohammadpur Upazila in Magura District. He passed Dakhil exam from Mohammadpur Baraktia S.A Dakhil Madrasah and HSC from Aminur Rahman Degree College. He is a student of the law department of Islamic University, Bangladesh in Kushtia.

References

External links 
 

Living people
1998 births
Bangladeshi footballers
Association football forwards
Team BJMC players
Muktijoddha Sangsad KC players
Bangladesh Premier League players
Bangladesh international footballers
Abahani Limited (Dhaka) players
Bangladesh Football Premier League players

Islamic University, Bangladesh alumni
People from Magura District